Mercedes Gloria Scápola Morán (born April 25, 1975 in Buenos Aires, Argentina) is an Argentine actress. She became famous thanks to the 2012 soap opera Graduados and the 2014 soap opera Guapas, both telenovelas. She is the daughter of actress Mercedes Morán.

Biography
Mercedes Scápola Morán is the daughter of actress Mercedes Morán. She studied theatre under Agustín Alezzo and Julio Chávez. She ceased using the last name "Morán" to avoid being confused with her mother, who already was a famous actress.

Career
She worked in the successful 2012 soap opera Graduados, playing housekeeper "Clarita." She joined the cast when the production was almost completed, and received a character that the writers initially considered a minor one. Her character was drafted as a humble Paraguayan; Scápola proposed instead to make it a native of the Córdoba Province, and always fussing about the house's condition. As it was her first major success in television and she did not spoof the slang from the Córdoba Province, and many fans mistook her for an actual native of the province. She was fluent in slang because her grandparents lived in that province, and she had already tried for it the film Rancho aparte. Mercedes Morán made a brief cameo in that soap opera as the mother of her character. Scápola got pregnant during the airing of the program, so the scripts made her character become pregnant as well. Her son León was born in 2013. Scápola returned to work in the 2014 soap opera Guapas. Her mother Mercedes Morán works in it as well. As they both enjoyed the cameo in Graduados, their characters are again mother and daughter within the plot.

Filmography

Television

Movies

Theater

Awards

Nominations
 Nominated for the Tato Award 2009 as new actress

References

External links
 
 

1975 births
Living people
Actresses from Buenos Aires
Argentine film actresses
Argentine telenovela actresses
Argentine television actresses
Argentine stage actresses
20th-century Argentine actresses
21st-century Argentine actresses